Wilson Independent School District is a public school district based in Wilson, Texas (USA).

The district operates one school serving grades PK-12.

Academic achievement
In 2009, the school district was rated "academically acceptable" by the Texas Education Agency.

Special programs

See also

List of school districts in Texas

References

External links
 Official site

School districts in Lynn County, Texas